Harriette J. Cooke was the first known female professor of  in the United States to have the same salary as an equally ranked man.

Cooke was born December 1, 1829 in Sandwich, New Hampshire. She graduated from the New Hampshire Conference Seminary, now Tilton School, in 1853. In 1857, and joined the faculty of Cornell College as a professor of German studies and history. In 1866 she became Preceptress of the college. Harriette Cooke was promoted to full professorship in 1871 where she was the first women to have received the title of Professor at Cornell. She remained a professor until her resignation at Cornell until 1890. Cooke founded the Cornell Association for the Higher Education of Women and published the book "Memories of my life work: The autobiography of Mrs. Harriet B. Cooke" published in 1858. Harriette Cooke died on July 27, 1914 at the age of 84.

References
https://bracketthousebnb.com/index.php/harriette

External links 
 Cornell College Women's Studies

Year of birth missing
Year of death missing
American women academics
Cornell College faculty
Tilton School alumni